Holy Trinity Church, Exmouth is a Grade II* listed parish church in the Church of England  in Exmouth.

History

The church was built between 1824 and 1825 by John Rolle, 1st Baron Rolle at the cost of £13,000. The chancel was added by Lady Rolle in 1856 and their nephew Mark Rolle commissioned a total re-modelling between 1905 and 1907 by George Halford Fellowes Prynne.

The church is united in a single parish with St Margaret and St Andrew's Church, Littleham, Exmouth.

Organ

The organ from the original church was expanded in 1878 by H.P. Dicker, and was restored in 1909.  This was rebuilt and expanded in 1953 by John Compton. A specification of the organ can be found on the National Pipe Organ Register.

References

Exmouth
Exmouth
Exmouth